Izzy and Moe is a 1985 American made-for-television comedy-crime film starring Jackie Gleason and Art Carney. It is a fictional account of two actual Prohibition-era policemen, Izzy Einstein and Moe Smith, and their adventures in tracking down illegal bars and gangsters. The film was originally broadcast on CBS on September 23, 1985.

Plot
During the Prohibition era of the 1920s, a gangster named John Vanderhoff, alias "The Dutchman", was killing off the competition and setting up his own speakeasys. To fight the  crime, the Prohibition Bureau needed to get some extra men. Izzy Einstein (Jackie Gleason) volunteers; he is desperate to have a steady paycheck to support his wife, mother-in-law and four daughters. Einstein wants to disprove his mother-in-law's claim that he is just a "bum".

When the agent in charge of the local Prohibition Unit office tells him there is no job, Einstein makes a speech: "This is America. And I'm proud to be an American..." When the chief tells Einstein that he is "too old" for this kind of job, Izzy quickly suggests taking a partner.  Moe Smith (Art Carney) recently had his underground bar discovered by the police and is spending too much time alone and drinking. Einstein meets with Smith and asks for his help. The idea of a steady paycheck convinces him.

When they first try to raid one of Dutch's bars, they find the gangster has converted it into a "reading hall". Izzy and Moe decide to use different tactics. After spotting a local baseball team, they ask their boss for 9 more men. They all dress as baseball players, and tell the gatekeeper at the bar they want to celebrate a win. They gain entry and enjoy it - then whip out their badges and arrest everyone in the bar.

Soon, Izzy and Moe have their own division within the unit; they work alone as a pair, get various costumes, and offer no explanations of their tactics.  Izzy and Moe soon successfully raid underground bars all over the city, and arrest such high-profile people as the district attorney. After their boss threatens to fire them, Izzy and Moe meet the press, and Izzy gives his "This is America" speech.  They are reinstated.

Moe, a widower, is attracted to Dallas Carter, an entertainer at one of the bars. He falls in love. Upset at losing so much money and booze to the cops, Dutch lures the pair to where a large shipment of bourbon is being kept. Izzy and Moe evade the trap, but Moe gets shot in the arm, and one of the agents is killed. The agents' death affects Moe, who again considers quitting, but he decides to stay, giving his own version of the "This is America" speech to reporters. Izzy and Moe then proceeded to rob the Dutch's big shipment of Bourbon that he is expecting, with help from Dallas, and also take the truck and its treasure to a police impound site.

The Dutchman finds out about Dallas tipping off the shipment, takes her hostage and tells Izzy and Moe to bring the bourbon for an exchange.  They go to his estate, dodging the bullets and capturing the corrupt police chief. When Moe confronts Dutch, the gangster is pointing a gun at Dallas' head. Moe offers himself; with Dutch about to shoot him, a gun blast knocks the gun away. Izzy emerges from hiding with a rifle. Moe says, "How could you chance taking a shot like that?" Izzy says, "I just pretended he had an apple on your head."

Cast

 Jackie Gleason as Izzy Einstein
 Art Carney as Moe Smith
 Cynthia Harris as Dallas Carter
 Zohra Lampert as Esther Einstein
 Dick Latessa as Lieutenant Murphy
 Jesse Doran as "Dutch"
 Roy Brocksmith as Sheriff Bledsoe
 Tom Wiggin as Agent Normal Harris
 Rick Washburn as Jake

References

External links

1985 television films
1985 films
1980s crime comedy films
American television films
American crime comedy films
Films about prohibition in the United States
Films about police officers
Films set in the 1920s
Films directed by Jackie Cooper
1980s American films